The Great Western Railway's ships operated in connection with the company's trains to provide services to Ireland, the Channel Islands and France. Powers were granted by Act of Parliament for the Great Western Railway (GWR) to operate ships in 1871. The following year the company took over the ships operated by Ford and Jackson on the route between Wales and Ireland. Services were operated between Weymouth, the Channel Islands and France on the former Weymouth and Channel Islands Steam Packet Company routes. Smaller GWR vessels were also used as tenders at Plymouth and on ferry routes on the River Severn and River Dart. The railway also operated tugs and other craft at their docks in Wales and South West England.

History

Isambard Kingdom Brunel, the GWR's chief engineer, envisaged the railway linking London with the United States of America. The plans for the transatlantic routes from Bristol failed to materialise but the ships found other uses. Although they were never owned by the Great Western Railway Company, several shareholders and officers of the railway also had interests in the ships.

The company's first vessels were two tugs working on the River Dee that were acquired with the Shrewsbury and Chester Railway in 1854. Two years later a service between Neyland in Wales and Waterford in Ireland was established in connection with the railway. This was operated by Ford and Jackson until 1 February 1872 when they were transferred to the railway company under powers obtained by the Great Western Railway (Steam Vessels) Act of 13 July 1871. The Act also allowed operation to the Channel Islands and France. These services were eventually provided from Weymouth, although the French services were only operated on a regular basis from 1878 to 1885. After this only cargo services were provided, often on a seasonal basis. The Channel Islands services were operated for the GWR by the Weymouth and Channel Island Steam Packet Company until August 1889 when the railway took on the operation of the route.

Meanwhile, the New Passage Ferry of the River Severn had become a GWR service when the Bristol and South Wales Union Railway was amalgamated in 1868. Another operation taken over by the GWR was the Plymouth Great Western Docks in 1876. The South Devon Railway Company held the majority of shares in the docks and was itself amalgamated with the GWR early in 1876. The docks used a fleet of tenders to land passengers and mails from transatlantic liners moored off-shore; the lighters also operated excursions to coastal towns in Devon and Cornwall. Some cargo services were later operated form Plymouth to Nantes in France. Also in Devon, in 1901 the GWR took over the Dartmouth Passenger Ferry that linked Kingswear railway station with Dartmouth. The GWR also acquired a large shareholding in the West Cornwall Railway which itself owned a part of the West Cornwall Steam Ship Company; GWR ships were occasionally used on its route from Penzance.

On 30 August 1906 the GWR's Welsh terminal was moved to a new harbour at Fishguard. It was hoped that transatlantic liners would also call en route to Liverpool but few did, Liverpool being forsaken for Southampton within a few years but this increased the number of liner calls at Plymouth. A similar change saw Rosslare become the principal railway harbour on the other side of Irish Sea although some services were still provided to Waterford. This work was undertaken in a joint venture with the Great Southern and Western Railway of Ireland known as the Fishguard and Rosslare Railways and Harbours.

Although it had a reputation as the "Great Way Round", the GWR opened several new lines to shorten its traditional main lines to the ports. The Severn Tunnel opened in 1886 to avoid a lengthy detour via Gloucester, although this saw the end of the company's ferry service across the River Severn. In the meantime, trains to Weymouth had been speeded up following the opening of the Stert and Westbury Railway in 1900, and the special trains carrying passengers and mails off the transatlantic liners at Plymouth used this and the Langport and Castle Cary Railway which opened in 1906.

The Railways Act 1921 brought a number of additional railway companies into the GWR, several of which operated docks and several had small vessels operating in these. The companies concerned were the Barry Railway, Cardiff Railway, Taff Vale Railway, Alexandra (Newport and South Wales) Docks and Railway, Port Talbot Railway and Docks and the Swansea Harbour Trust. The GWR was nationalised on 1 January 1948 to become part of British Railways but the shipping services continued much the same as before for several years.

Sea-going ships

River ferries
 Chepstow (1874–1890) 188 tons
A new paddle steamer was delivered to the New Passage Ferry in 1874. She was made redundant by the new Severn Tunnel railway line at the end of 1886. She was sold to a Cardiff owner who converted her to screw propulsion and renamed her Rover.
 Christopher Thomas (1868–1890) 168 tons
Named after the company’s chairman, this paddle steamer was built for the Bristol and South Wales Union Railway by Henderson, Coulborn and Company at Renfrew in 1854. She was transferred to the GWR when the B&SWUR was amalgamated ten years later, she was redundant after 1886.
  (1901–1908) 61 tons
On 7 March 1902 she conveyed King Edward VII to Dartmouth to lay the foundation stone of the  Britannia Royal Naval College. For this duty she was fitted with a carpet, curtains, a table and upholstered chairs.
 Ferry No. 2 (1922–1947) 8 tons
A small ferry used on Bute Docks at Cardiff, acquired with the Cardiff Railway.
 Ilton Castle (1927 – ca.1930) 53 tons
Originally built in 1906, this paddle steamer came to the GWR from March and Southwood of Salcombe and was used for excursions from Salcombe.
 Kenwith Castle (1927–1932) 53 tons
Built in 1914 for the Kingsbridge ferry, this paddle steamer came to the GWR from March and Southwood of Salcombe and was used for excursions from Salcombe. She was sold to the Tamar Transport Company who sold her in 1935 to the Millbrook Steamboat and Trading Company at Plymouth who operated her on the Millbrook Ferry as the Whitsand Castle.
  (1908–1947) 117 tons
A replacement vessel for the Dartmouth ferry, she was built at Falmouth and was a familiar sight on the service for 47 years until withdrawn by British Railways on 8 October 1954.

Tugs and work boats

A to M
 Archibald Hood (1922–1947) 164 tons
A Barry Railway tug, built in 1898 at Falmouth, she served with British Railways until 1950.
 Armine (1899–1936) 7 tons
A small, Cowes-built 13-year-old launch added to the Weymouth fleet in 1899. She was mainly used to move coaling barges around the harbour but held a certificate for 12 passengers. The last coal-fired vessel at Weymouth, the Great Western (1902) left in 1932 and the Armine was sold in September 1936 for conversion to a motor boat.
 Baron Glanely (1946–1947)
See Lord Glanely.
 Basingstoke (1920 - ?) 402 tons
A double-grab excavator-dredger purchased from the London and South Western Railway.
 Beaufort (1923 – ?) 119 tons
A former Swansea Harbour Trustees vessel.
 Bruce (1922 - ?) 141 tons
A dredger at Alexandra Docks, Newport.
 Cardiff (1940-47) 181 tons. 
Launched as Foremost 97. To British Railways, Sold 1963, scrapped 1964.
 Clevedon (1876–1886) 167 tons
A paddle steamer used around Bristol by the Bristol and Exeter Railway from 1875.
 Cymro (1854 – ca.1881) 70 tons
A wooden paddle tug acquired with the Shrewsbury and Chester Railway. She was launched in 1826 and taken out of service sometime after 1878.
 David Davies (1925–1947) 962 tons
A bucket dredger for Barry Docks.
 Don Frederico (1923–1947) 481 tons
A Swansea Harbour Trustees dredger.
 The Earl (1922 – ca. 1931) 101 tons
A former Cardiff Railway tug.
 The Earl (1931–1947) 148 tons
A replacement tug for Cardiff.
 Emily Charlotte (1922–1933) 122 tons
A tug acquired with Port Talbot docks.
 Foremost 27 (1925–1947) 512 tons
A self-powered hopper barge used at Cardiff Docks.
 Francis Gilbertson (1928–1947) 275 tons
A grab dredger used at Bristol Channel ports.
 Horace (1922–1947) 141 tons
A tug at Alexandra Docks, Newport.
 Lady Tredegar (1922–1947) 105 tons
A tug at Alexandra Docks, Newport.
 Lord Glanely (1927–1946) 156 tons
A tug for use at Cardiff, she was renamed Baron Glanely on his lordship’s elevation in 1946.
 Manxman (1891 – ca.1897) 56 tons
A tug for the River Dee at Chester, built at Middlesbrough by R Craggs and Son.
 Mudeford (1924–1947) 232 tons
A grab dredger for Cardiff docks.

N to Z
 Palmerston (1883 - ?) 109 tons
Originally built in 1864, she was purchased from the Dover Harbour Board and normally worked in West Wales.
 Porteur No. 5 (1899 – ?)
A small ship for the Fishguard and Rosslare works.
 Robert Vassall (1922–1947) 317 tons
A bucket-dredger acquired with the Taff Vale Railway.
 St Baruch (1922–1947) 177 tons
A tug built at Falmouth in 1916 for the Barry Railway.
 Sir Ernest Palmer (1924–1947) 753 tons
A self-powered hopper barge used at Cardiff Docks.
 Sir Henry Mather Jackson (1924–1947) 735 tons
A self-powered hopper barge used at Cardiff Docks.
 Sir John R. Wright (1921–1938) 95 tons
A tug stationed at Fishguard.
 Swansea (1923–1947) 147 tons
A former Swansea Harbour Trustees tug.
 Taff (1946-47)
A hopper dredger. To British Transport Commission 1948. Deleted from shipping registers in 1955 but still extant in 1969.
 Test (1854 – ?)
A wooden paddle tug acquired with the Shrewsbury and Chester Railway in 1854; she was withdrawn from service in the 1880s.
 Thames (1886–1903) 103 tons
This tug was twenty years old when she came into Great Western ownership.
 Trusty (1923–1947) 148 tons
A former Swansea Harbour Trustees tug.
 Viscount Churchill (1924–1947) 735 tons
A self-powered hopper barge used at Cardiff Docks.
 Voltaic (1896–1900) 580 tons
Built in 1867, this steamer was the first owned by the Fishguard and Rosslare Harbours and Railways Company and was employed by them on a service from Bristol to Wexford.
 Weston (1876–1885) 166 tons
A paddle steamer built for the Bristol and Exeter Railway in 1875 for use around Bristol.
 Windsor (1932–1947) 150 tons
A tug for use at Barry Docks.

Liveries
Hulls were painted black with red below the waterline; from 1889 to 1914 there was a white band at main deck level. Paddle-boxes and upper works were buff coloured, funnel red, and the company's coat of arms was carried on the bow. Fishguard and Rosslare vessels were similar but had brown, later white, upper works. The flag was white with narrow red bands at top and bottom.

References

See also
 Irish Mercantile Marine during World War II

Shipping services
Great Western Railway
Lists of ships of the United Kingdom